Warrington, known in Māori as Ōkāhau, is a small settlement on the coast of Otago, in the South Island of New Zealand. It is situated close to the northern shore of Blueskin Bay, an area of mudflats north of Dunedin, and is administered as part of Dunedin City. The Main South Line railway passes through the township and a tourist train, the Seasider passes through the settlement once or twice a week between Dunedin and Palmerston.

Warrington beach, a popular surf beach for locals and visitors from the city, is patrolled by volunteer lifeguards of the Warrington Surf Life Saving Club which established in Dunedin in 1957 and relocated here in 1976.

Warrington Beach is occasionally used by naturists for nude sunbathing. New Zealand has no official nude beaches, as public nudity is legal on any beach where it is "known to occur".

St Barnabas Church is one of the area's oldest buildings.

Education
A school has existed at Warrington since at least 1879.

Warrington Playcentre is an early childhood centre (ages 0–6).

Demographics
Warrington is described by Statistics New Zealand as a rural settlement.

Warrington had a population of 489 at the 2018 New Zealand census, an increase of 42 people (9.4%) since the 2013 census, and an increase of 60 people (14.0%) since the 2006 census. There were 237 households. There were 249 males and 240 females, giving a sex ratio of 1.04 males per female, with 93 people (19.0%) aged under 15 years, 54 (11.0%) aged 15 to 29, 249 (50.9%) aged 30 to 64, and 90 (18.4%) aged 65 or older.

Ethnicities were 94.5% European/Pākehā, 11.0% Māori, 2.5% Asian, and 1.2% other ethnicities (totals add to more than 100% since people could identify with multiple ethnicities).

Although some people objected to giving their religion, 62.6% had no religion, 24.5% were Christian, 0.6% were Muslim and 3.7% had other religions.

Of those at least 15 years old, 153 (38.6%) people had a bachelor or higher degree, and 48 (12.1%) people had no formal qualifications. The employment status of those at least 15 was that 183 (46.2%) people were employed full-time, 60 (15.2%) were part-time, and 9 (2.3%) were unemployed.

References

External links
 Blueskin Bay community website
 Warrington School website

Populated places in Otago
Beaches of Otago
Nude beaches
Naturism in New Zealand